The 1996 Vernons World Darts Championship was the third year that the Professional Darts Corporation (then known as the World Darts Council) held their own World Championships following an acrimonious split from the British Darts Organisation during 1992/93. The tournament had its third sponsor in as many years, with Vernons taking over from Proton Cars.  The tournament was held at the Circus Tavern in Purfleet between 26 December 1995 and 1 January 1996.

Although he had not officially announced his retirement, Jocky Wilson had played his last televised competitive darts match at the World Matchplay in Blackpool in the summer of 1995, and had walked away from darts suddenly on 23 December 1995, so didn't appear at the 1996 World Championship, with Phil Taylor and Dennis Priestley both making an appeal after their 1996 World Championship final for Jocky and Malvina (Jocky's wife) to return. Nigel Justice and Steve Raw were the two English players making their WDC World Championship debuts.

Phil Taylor defeated Dennis Priestley 6–4 in the final, with Taylor gaining revenge for his 1994 final defeat against Priestley. It was Taylor's fourth overall World Championship victory.

Seeds

 Phil Taylor
 Rod Harrington
 Dennis Priestley
 John Lowe
 Peter Evison
 Alan Warriner
 Bob Anderson
 Kevin Spiolek

Prize money
The prize fund was £62,500.

Results

Group stage

Group A

26 December

27 December

28 December

Group B

26 December

27 December

28 December

Group C

26 December

27 December

28 December

Group D

26 December

27 December

28 December

Group E

26 December

27 December

28 December

Group F

26 December

27 December

28 December

Group G

26 December

27 December

28 December

Group H

26 December

27 December

28 December

Knockout stages

References

External links
Results from Mastercaller

PDC World Darts Championships
WDC World Darts Championship 1996
WDC World Darts Championship
WDC World Darts Championship
WDC World Darts Championship
Purfleet
Sport in Essex